Trimma barralli, commonly known as Barral's pygmy goby or red pygmy goby, is a species of goby native to the western Indian Ocean, particularly the Gulf of Aqaba and the Red Sea.

It inhabits deep water tropical reef settings, generally being found below .

References 

barralli
Taxa named by Richard Winterbottom
Fish described in 1995